Kindline (Yiddish: קינדליין,  is a New York City-based Yiddish-language weekly magazine founded in late 2014 by current editor-in-chief Mendel Paneth, with the first edition appearing on December 16, 2014.

Originally aimed at children and young adults, Kindline is now read by all ages, and distributed worldwide weekly. Distribution scope is chiefly in areas where Yiddish readers reside, which include the United States, Canada, the UK, Belgium, Switzerland, Austria, and Israel.

Articles and features include an elucidation of the Weekly Torah portion, world history, Jewish history, wildlife, travel, comics, crafts, puzzles, parables, and stories.

Writers and illustrators
Kindline is unique among Charedi publications in that writers and illustrators must attribute their work using their real name within the magazine, and not use a pseudonym as is traditionally accepted at many Yiddish publications.

Kindline writers and editors are mostly noted educators, teachers or speakers in the Chareidi community. The editorial board includes author and lecturer, Rabbi Fishel Shachter, editor-in-chief Mendel Paneth and Dovid Weber. Staff writers include Ari Abramowitz, and historian Joseph Kwadrat among many others.

Kindline weekly illustrations and comics are mostly the works of Batsheva Havlin, Avram Zmora, Motty Heller and several other artists. However, drawings and comics series by acclaimed Israeli artists, such as Yoel Waxberger, Gadi Pollak, Jacky Yarhi, Deborah Kotovsky are frequently published and appear regularly in special issues, such as the Purim or Pesach magazines.

Books 

In collaboration with illustrators, writers, and publishing company Kinder Shpiel, Kindline regularly publishes hardcover comic books of comic serials and other weekly columns that were previously printed in the magazine.

References

External links 
 Geshichta-line: History research article on the life of the Jewish people by Joseph Kwadrat, Yichus and Jewish history researcher.

Yiddish periodicals
Magazines established in 2014
Weekly magazines published in the United States
Lifestyle magazines published in the United States
Magazines published in New York City
Yiddish culture in New York City